94th NBR Awards
Best Film:
Top Gun: Maverick

The 94th National Board of Review Awards, honoring the best in film for 2022, were announced on December 8, 2022.

The gala was held on January 8, 2023 at Cipriani 42nd Street, in New York City, and hosted by television personality and journalist Willie Geist.

Top 10 Films
Films listed alphabetically except top, which is ranked as Best Film of the Year:

Top Gun: Maverick
 Aftersun
 Avatar: The Way of Water
 The Banshees of Inisherin
 Everything Everywhere All at Once
 The Fabelmans
 Glass Onion: A Knives Out Mystery
 RRR
 Till
 The Woman King
 Women Talking

Top 5 International Films
Close
 All Quiet on the Western Front
 Argentina, 1985
 Decision to Leave
 EO
 Saint Omer

Top 5 Documentaries
"Sr."
 All the Beauty and the Bloodshed
 All That Breathes
 Descendant
 Turn Every Page: The Adventures of Robert Caro and Robert Gottlieb
 Wildcat

Top 10 Independent Films
 Armageddon Time
 Emily the Criminal
 The Eternal Daughter
 Funny Pages
 The Inspection
 Living
 A Love Song
 Nanny
 To Leslie
 The Wonder

Winners

Best Film:
 Top Gun: Maverick

Best Director:
 Steven Spielberg – The Fabelmans

Best Actor:
 Colin Farrell – The Banshees of Inisherin

Best Actress:
 Michelle Yeoh – Everything Everywhere All at Once

Best Supporting Actor:
 Brendan Gleeson – The Banshees of Inisherin

Best Supporting Actress:
 Janelle Monáe – Glass Onion: A Knives Out Mystery

Best Original Screenplay:
 Martin McDonagh – The Banshees of Inisherin

Best Adapted Screenplay:
 Edward Berger, Lesley Paterson, and Ian Stokell – All Quiet on the Western Front

Best Animated Feature:
 Marcel the Shell with Shoes On

Breakthrough Performance:
 Danielle Deadwyler – Till
 Gabriel LaBelle – The Fabelmans

Best Directorial Debut:
 Charlotte Wells – Aftersun

Best International Film:
 Close

Best Documentary:
 "Sr."

Best Ensemble:
 Women Talking

Outstanding Achievement in Cinematography:
 Claudio Miranda – Top Gun: Maverick

NBR Freedom of Expression:
 All the Beauty and the Bloodshed
 Argentina, 1985

References

External links
 

2022 film awards
2022 in American cinema
National Board of Review Awards